Heinrich Smidt (1798–1867) was a German writer. He wrote novels and adventure stories about the sea, as well as the article "Die Klabautermann", about the German water sprite of the same name, in the German publication Seegemälde in 1828.

References 

1798 births
1867 deaths
German male writers